Publius Aelius Paetus (fl. c. 240 BC – 174 BC) was a Roman consul of the late 3rd century BC. He was a prominent supporter and ally of Scipio Africanus, and was elected censor with Africanus in 199.

Family
Publius Aelius Paetus was apparently the elder surviving son of Quintus Aelius Paetus, a praetor who was killed at Cannae in August 216 BC. The father may have been descended from Publius Aelius Paetus, who was consul in 337 BC and a Master of the Horse, and as such, one of the earliest plebeian consuls; another ancestor may have been Gaius Aelius Paetus, consul in 286 BC.

His younger brother was Sextus Aelius Paetus Catus who became consul in 198 and censor in 194, and is best known to us via Cicero as a jurist and commentator on the Twelve Tables. Publius was also a jurist.

Political life
Aelius Paetus makes relatively few appearances in Livy's History of Rome. He was aedile in 204 BC, was elected praetor in 203 BC and then selected as Master of the Horse, and became consul in 201 with Gnaeus Cornelius L.f. Lentulus.

In his year as consul, he made a treaty with the Ingauni Ligures and was appointed one of the ten decemvirs for the distribution of lands of the ager publicus among the veteran soldiers of Scipio Africanus in Samnium and Apulia.

In 199 he was elected censor with Africanus himself. The two censors were relatively liberal in their lustrum and degraded none.

Paetus died in 174 during a pestilence at Rome, as recorded by Livy in a fragmentary chapter.

His son was Quintus Aelius Paetus, who became consul in 167.

References

3rd-century BC births
174 BC deaths
3rd-century BC Roman augurs
3rd-century BC Roman consuls
3rd-century BC Roman praetors
2nd-century BC Roman augurs
2nd-century BC diplomats
Paetus, Publius
Curule aediles
Magistri equitum (Roman Republic)
Roman censors
Year of birth uncertain